, son of regent Nijō Mochimichi, was a Japanese kugyō (court noble) of the Muromachi period (1336–1573). He held a regent position kampaku from 1470 to 1476. He was the father of regent Nijō Hisamoto.

References
 

1443 births
1480 deaths
Fujiwara clan
Masatsugu